Smith River (Tolowa: Kaa-nvsh) is a town and census-designated place in Del Norte County, California, located near the Oregon border. Smith River is the headquarters of the Tolowa Dee-ni' Nation, a federally recognized tribe of Tolowa people. As of the 2020 census, the population was 906. It is bordered by the Smith River National Recreation Area.

History 
A post office was opened in 1863. One early settler of Smith River was William Dows Rexford, who moved there with his sons in the early 1870s. The town has formerly been known as Smith River Corners, Smith's River Valley, Smiths River, and Smith's River.

Demographics
The 2010 United States Census reported that Smith River had a population of 866. The racial makeup of Smith River was 528 (61.0%) White, 1 (0.1%) African American, 59 (6.8%) Native American, 5 (0.6%) Asian, 0 (0.0%) Pacific Islander, 234 (27.0%) from other races, and 39 (4.5%) from two or more races. Hispanic or Latino of any race were 293 persons (33.8%).

The Census reported that 866 people (100% of the population) lived in households, 0 (0%) lived in non-institutionalized group quarters, and 0 (0%) were institutionalized.

There were 315 households, out of which 127 (40.3%) had children under the age of 18 living in them, 160 (50.8%) were opposite-sex married couples living together, 44 (14.0%) had a female householder with no husband present, 18 (5.7%) had a male householder with no wife present. There were 22 (7.0%) unmarried opposite-sex partnerships, and 3 (1.0%) same-sex married couples or partnerships. 76 households (24.1%) were made up of individuals, and 40 (12.7%) had someone living alone who was 65 years of age or older. The average household size was 2.75. There were 222 families (70.5% of all households); the average family size was 3.23.

The population was spread out, with 267 people (30.8%) under the age of 18, 55 people (6.4%) aged 18 to 24, 220 people (25.4%) aged 25 to 44, 217 people (25.1%) aged 45 to 64, and 107 people (12.4%) who were 65 years of age or older. The median age was 34.8 years. For every 100 females, there were 92.0 males. For every 100 females age 18 and over, there were 91.4 males.

The homeowner vacancy rate was 3.2%; the rental vacancy rate was 3.6%. 473 people (54.6% of the population) lived in owner-occupied housing units and 393 people (45.4%) lived in rental housing units.

Climate

Smith River is the wettest human-inhabited spot in the state of California, and experiences an Oceanic climate, for it is just beyond the northern periphery of the Mediterranean climate zone of coastal California. Seasonal precipitation patterns strictly follow the patterns evident in a Mediterranean regime however, although the rather copious average annual precipitation amount of  wildly exceeds the  precipitation limit for Mediterranean climates implemented in the revised version of the Köppen climate classification by over twofold. The summer months from June to September receive very stark precipitation (profoundly similar to a Mediterranean climate), with July and August in particular being relatively dry. In stark contrast, winter is stupendously wet, and windy, with approximately 74% of the year's total average precipitation observed in the five-month period from November to March. Temperatures remain profoundly moderate throughout the year, fluctuating only several degrees.

Politics 

In popular culture 
Smith River was listed as one of the filming sites for the 1983 film Return of the Jedi, alongside Buttercup Valley and Death Valley in the east and southeast portions of the state, respectively.

See also

References

Census-designated places in Del Norte County, California
Census-designated places in California
1863 establishments in California
Populated coastal places in California